Gerda Elżbieta Bryłka (later Krajciczek, born 12 August 1941) is a retired Polish gymnast. She competed at the 1964 Summer Olympics in all artistic gymnastics events and finished in seventh place in the team competition. Her best individual result was 20th place in the floor exercise.

References

1941 births
Living people
Gymnasts at the 1964 Summer Olympics
Olympic gymnasts of Poland
Polish female artistic gymnasts
People from Świętochłowice
Sportspeople from Silesian Voivodeship
20th-century Polish women